The Cabinet of Hartling was the government of Denmark from 19 December 1973 to 13 February 1975. The minority cabinet was composed of 12 members of Venstre, led by Poul Hartling. The cabinet members resigned on 13 February 1975, as a result of the party losing that year's election.

List of ministers
The cabinet members were as follows:

References

External links

1973 establishments in Denmark
1975 disestablishments in Denmark
Hartling
Cabinets established in 1973
Cabinets disestablished in 1975